It's Your Fault is a 2013 satirical video starring Kalki Koechlin and VJ Juhi Pandey that deals with the issue of rape in India, and went viral on the internet with over 5,500,000 views on YouTube. It was created by All India Bakchod.

The group of stand-up comedians known as 'AIB' came up with the satirical video in the wake of sexual assault cases in India. The group consists of Tanmay Bhat, Gursimran Khamba, Rohan Joshi and Ashish Shakya. Bollywood actress Kalki Koechlin and VJ Juhi Pandey featured in the video. The campaign showcases different dimensions of a victim's life. 
The video mocks the Indian mindset that blames women for provoking rape.

Production and making

Rohan Joshi explained, "It's not what you would expect from a group of four funny guys, and that's just the point. Nothing at all, no part of this, is funny, and therefore we approached it in a different way. The response has been amazing, from the moment we posted the video till now. It is something that every person we know relates to and feels strongly about."

Juhi Pandey who co-starred in the videos said "We knew when we were shooting the video that it would get a lot of reactions. Eyebrows would be raised and there would be a lot of discussion. We've all had these discussions in our social groups and have all felt angry and frustrated at these statements that have made headlines. Yes, this video will only reach the English-speaking, 'sarcasm-understanding' young person, but at least it's out there. It's a drop in the ocean, but it is still a drop and I am glad to have been a part of it."

Initially, Koechlin was reluctant to do it as she was swamped with work but "when Bhat sent the script, I changed my mind." She adds, "It was so funny, clever and relevant to what’s happening that I immediately agreed." She said "We were worried about people not understanding the sarcasm. It’s a sensitive topic and we were anxious that it might backfire," adding that the intention was not to offend anyone. "Humour is a fantastic way to deal with a serious subject. You are making people uncomfortable, but at the same time you are not preaching or forcing views down their throat."

Content

The video included as motifs absurd excuses for rape given by Indian politicians and functionaries, such as :
 Provocative clothing being responsible for rape.
 Marriage as a panacea for rape, and marital rape.
 Chowmein causing hormonal imbalances justifying sexual violence.
 Cell phone use by girls affecting morals.
 Calling a rapist bhaiya (brother) could deter rape, as advocated by spiritual figure Asaram Bapu.
 Girls not accompanied by male guardians invited rape.

Reception
The video went viral and was posted on 19 September has over 4,713,620 views on YouTube. The video went viral on almost all social networking sites.

The Hindu reviewed the video by saying "This venture can’t have been easy given the seriousness of the topic and the delicate sensibilities of the public. Taking an issue like patriarchy or rape and choosing to get your message across via satire must have been incredibly difficult to do. The AIB team, I think, were largely successful because of the glaring obviousness of the hurt and the relevance of this cause to the women featured in the video." ... "AIB’s It’s your fault scores."

The response to the video was so enormous that people wanted the creators to dub it into other languages so that it could reach a wider audience.

See also 
 2012 Delhi gang rape
 Blank Noise
 Priya's Shakti
 Sexism in India
 Slut-shaming
 SlutWalk
 Victim blaming
 Women in India

References

External links 
 AIB365: It's Your Fault on YouTube

Rape in India
2013 YouTube videos
2013 short films
Indian satirical films
2010s feminist films
2010s satirical films